Star Wars: Rise of the Resistance is an attraction at Star Wars: Galaxy's Edge at Disney's Hollywood Studios and Disneyland. The attraction—a combined trackless dark ride, walk-through, motion simulator, and drop ride system—puts guests into the middle of a battle between the Resistance and the First Order. Featuring four interworking ride systems in conjunction with Audio-Animatronics, practical sets, projection mapping and screen-based media, Rise of the Resistance is one of the most complex and advanced attractions designed by Walt Disney Imagineering.

History
Announced alongside the land's official announcement at the 2015 D23 Expo in Anaheim, the attraction was originally described as guests "being placed in the middle of a climactic battle between the First Order and the Resistance". On November 17, 2018 at a Destination D event, the attraction's name was announced as Star Wars: Rise of the Resistance.

Film actors Daisy Ridley, Oscar Isaac, John Boyega, Adam Driver, Domhnall Gleeson, and Kipsang Rotich reprised their roles in the attraction as Rey, Poe Dameron, Finn, Kylo Ren, General Hux, and the voice of Nien Nunb, respectively. James Arnold Taylor provided the voice of Lieutenant Bek. Industrial Light & Magic created the CGI sequences for the attraction.

The construction of the attraction posed unprecedented technical challenges. Not only does the ride contain 65 Audio-Animatronic figures, but the ride building itself required the largest concrete pour in the history of Disney Parks. More than five million lines of code control the various aspects of the ride. It has been called a "technical masterpiece".

The attraction was originally planned to open with Galaxy's Edge on opening day, but on March 7, 2019, it was announced that it would open later than the rest of Galaxy's Edge for "phase two". On July 11, 2019, the opening dates for Rise of the Resistance were revealed with Disney's Hollywood Studios' version opening first on December 5, 2019, followed by Disneyland's version opening on January 17, 2020.

A media event for the attraction at Disney's Hollywood Studios was held from December 3–4, 2019 in which guests attending the event were able to experience the attraction.

Attraction

Queue
The attraction is located in the area of Galaxy's Edge known as the ancient ruins on the outskirts of Black Spire Outpost, which includes a Resistance encampment. The briefing also includes Poe Dameron, Nien Nunb, and Mon Calamari Lieutenant Bek, all appearing on video screens. Guests then walk past ships, including Dameron's X-wing fighter, and board a resistance CEC Intersystem Transport Ship for the first portion of the ride. On board, Bek speaks to guests as Nien Nunb pilots the ship, which is escorted by Dameron and other X-wings. Dameron is forced to go for help when the transport and fighters are attacked by a First Order Star Destroyer which appears to capture the guests' ship and pull it inside a hangar bay filled with stormtroopers. The recruits then are brought into a cell where Kylo Ren and Armitage Hux discuss their interrogation. Then with help from Finn, disguised as a stormtrooper, the freed recruits board a hijacked First Order Fleet Transport (an eight-seat ride vehicle) piloted by an R5 unit to travel to an escape pod.

Ride experience
The ride begins with Finn explaining how to get to the escape pods. The two transports exit the loading station where they pass two other empty transports heading into the loading station, with Bek speaking to the riders through the transports' radio. They enter another room where a probe droid nearly spots them. However, when about to reach two lifts, two stormtroopers spot the guests. The stormtroopers attempt to blast at the transports, but fail as the transports escape. They enter the next room which includes AT-ATs. The door leading out of the room closes before the transports can pass through. The stormtroopers spot the transports again and attempt to blast at them. An audio-animatronic Finn in a stormtrooper suit helps the guests as the transports split up and enter two lifts. Finn tells them to go down, but they go up instead. One of the vehicles is spotted by an AT-AT pilot and is almost blasted.

In the next room, audio-animatronic figures of Kylo Ren and General Hux are seen atop the ship's bridge discussing the situation. Suddenly, a Resistance ship fleet appears and Ren notices the transports. The riders attempt to escape, but Ren jumps down in front of them and ignites his lightsaber as the transports enter two lifts, though the doors close in front of them before he can get to them. As the lifts go down, Kylo's lightsaber suddenly cuts through the ceiling as they escape. The riders then enter a room with three cannons firing at the Resistance, which they pass under and make it into the next room where an audio-animatronic Ren uses the Force on the transports, demanding that they tell him the whereabouts of the Resistance Base. Suddenly, a burning TIE fighter wall behind Ren and he is almost blown out into space as debris falls over him. If the animatronic of Kylo Ren is not working, an alternate ending is triggered. Ren instead appears through the windows in front of the transports in his TIE Fighter and threatens to blast them if they don't give him information on the Resistance Base. All of a sudden, a Resistance X Wing shoots down Kylo Ren's TIE Fighter and the transports escape. The transports enter the next room and enter the escape pods, where the ride turns into a motion simulator. After two other pods eject, the riders' pods undergo a sudden vertical drop and escape back onto Batuu. The transports exit the simulator and enter the hangar, where an audio-animatronic Bek is seen in his escape pod, having just crash landed in the base. They then enter the unload station where the ride ends.

Technology and effects 

Rise of the Resistance is the most technologically advanced theme park attraction in existence today. The ride features multiple ride systems, including motion simulators, trackless dark ride vehicles, and a version of the Tower of Terror's drop shaft. 

In the briefing room scene, BB-8 can be seen rolling on a rock wall. He is actually a puppet attached to a robotic arm with a rotating spherical shell, which is the reason why he rolls up to a specific point. Next to BB-8 is a large hologram effect of Rey, which is accomplished with an OLED display behind a one-way mirror. In the transport, guests enter and exit through the same door, but exit onto the Star Destroyer. The transport is a motion simulator on a turntable. While the simulator is in motion, it is rotated so that guests will exit into the Star Destroyer set with moving flaps for safety once the simulator has stopped. The animation is in sync with the circular motion. 

During the interrogation, the images of General Hux and Kylo Ren are a Musion effect; however additional projectors are used to create shadows as though the actors were physically present. Before the riders board their vehicles, projection effects and strobe lights are used to simulate the metal being cut, which slides away through the use of a mechanism. Riders then board a ride vehicle that utilizes wireless charging, as well as RFID pucks in the floor to give the vehicle position data and allow it to navigate the attraction without a track. The vehicles are always stationed on charging pads when they are in the load and unload zones in order to remain at full charge. 

The blasters throughout the ride use either a persistence of vision effect or arrays of LEDs to give the illusion the beams are traveling through air. Projectors and flipping panels are also used to simulate damage as it occurs to equipment and sets during the ride. 

The room with AT-ATs only contains two, but the use of a mirror makes it look like there are four. When the vehicles stop on the lifts, flaps come up to prevent the vehicles from rolling off. When Kylo Ren appears for the second time, he is a projection on a moving screen, while his lightsaber is a prop. 

In the elevator scene (which is actually a static room with lights to give the illusion the riders are in a moving elevator), the blade of Kylo Ren's lightsaber is actually a rapidly spinning light panel which moves on a semicircular track to give the illusion it is cutting through the roof. The cannons are situated in front of a large screen. Each cannon has its own system to ensure it does not hit the vehicles. Blasts from the Resistance cause damage to the walls, which are actually panels that move away to show internal parts. 

During the scene where the wall breaks behind Kylo Ren, panels move away to simulate breaking (an effect originally used in Mystic Manor), complete with a wind effect to simulate being blown out. The escape pods are a motion simulator on a drop shaft in front of a large projection screen. Each pod also has a locking mechanism to prevent the vehicles from sliding.

Reaction

The ride has received widespread acclaim. During its reporting of its fiscal first-quarter 2020 results on February 4, The Walt Disney Company announced that attendance rose 2 percent at its domestic theme parks during that quarter. Moreover, spending at the U.S. parks was up 10 percent.  Disney CEO Bob Iger reported that the twin debuts of the Rise of the Resistance attractions in both Walt Disney World and Disneyland have contributed to an increase in per-capita spending in the parks.

Due to significant guest demand, Disney initially implemented a system of gaining a place on the ride via their respective Disney park smartphone app, as opposed to their usual "FastPass" system. Guests were required to register for a boarding group (effectively a virtual queue) on their phone or at in-park kiosks in order to gain access to the ride, which garnered mixed reactions from park attendees in both Disneyland and Disney's Hollywood Studios. Early on, guests found that boarding groups filled for the day within minutes of the park opening, requiring guests to arrive to the park at its opening time in order to secure a place in line to go on the ride. The boarding group numbers were "called" sequentially through the day; there was no specific time at which a given group would be called, and after receiving the call (by mobile push notification) a guest had one hour to enter the queue line for the ride. When the Disneyland version first opened, there was only one window for the virtual queue for the attraction, but after Disneyland reopened on April 30, 2021 after being closed for over a year due to the COVID-19 pandemic, an additional second window was added to the virtual queue system giving guests a better chance at reserving a spot on the ride.  As of July 2021, it took less than a second for the virtual queue to be filled. For a time, guests needed be in the park to apply for a boarding group and Disney took the step of opening the main hub of the Hollywood Studios park early to implement this new system. In November 2020, the necessity to be in the park for the first distribution of boarding groups at 7am was removed; the second distribution at 1pm still required guests to have entered the park.

From September 23, 2021, the boarding group virtual queue system was paused, meaning that guests at Disney Hollywood Studios could, for the first time, walk up and wait in line for Rise of the Resistance. The change led to very high demand and queue lines running through a large part of the park.  The Disneyland version of the ride followed suit the following November.

References

External links
 Disney's Hollywood Studios Website
 Disneyland Website

Amusement rides introduced in 2019
Amusement rides introduced in 2020
Disney's Hollywood Studios
Disneyland
Walt Disney Studios Park
Rise of the Resistanc
Audio-Animatronic attractions
Dark rides
Drop tower rides
Simulator rides
Walt Disney Parks and Resorts attractions
Rise of the Resistanc
2019 establishments in Florida
2020 establishments in California